Erythrolamprus jaegeri, Jaeger's ground snake, is a species of snake in the family Colubridae. The species is found in Brazil, Uruguay, Paraguay,
and Argentina.

References

Erythrolamprus
Reptiles of Brazil
Reptiles of Uruguay
Reptiles of Paraguay
Reptiles of Argentina
Reptiles described in 1858
Taxa named by Albert Günther